Transamerica or Transamerican may refer to:

 TransAmerica (board game), a railroad board game
 The Transamerica or Transamerica Senior Golf Championship, a golf tournament in Napa, California 1989–2002
 TransAmerica Athletic Conference
 TransAmerica Bicycle Trail
 TransAmerica Bike Route, a cross-country bicycle route east of the Mississippi River in the United States
 Transamerica (film), a 2005 comedy-drama film
 Transamerica (soundtrack), the 2005 film's soundtrack
 Transamerica Airlines, a defunct airline which offered charter service from and within the United States
 Transamerica Corporation, a holding company for various life insurance companies and investment firms in the United States
 Transamerica Plaque, a discontinued annual award in the Quebec Major Junior Hockey League
 Transamerica Pyramid, the second-tallest skyscraper in San Francisco, owned by the Transamerica Corporation
 Transamerica Tower (Baltimore)
 Transamérica Pop, a Brazilian radio station
 Trans America Wire service, a wire transfer service set up by Al Capone with the help of Benjamin "Bugsy" Siegel

See also
 Trans Am (disambiguation)
 Across America (disambiguation)
 Coast to Coast (disambiguation)